The Sharp SX862 was a mobile phone designed by the Sharp Corporation. It featured a 3.2 inch, 16:9 widescreen VGA resolution display that offered a 2000:1 contrast ratio. It had a T-shaped swivel form.

History 
The Sharp SX862 was an international version of the Sharp 920SH, which was originally released in Japan in late 2007.

Features

Screen 
The Sharp SX862 featured a swiveling 3.2 inch AQUOS liquid crystal widescreen (854 x 480 pixels) display.  The display used Sharp CG Silicon technology, which allowed for consistent picture quality. Sharp’s proprietary Mobile Advance Super View technology enabled a 160 degree viewing angle by minimizing glare and reflections.

Media player 
The Sharp SX862 offered high quality video playback and media player capabilities. Users had a variety of means to transfer content into the SX862, which also acted as a music player and offered playback for what was at the time a wide variety of digital audio formats.

Internet 
The Sharp SX862 supported high-speed HSPA 3.6Mbit/s Internet connectivity and web browsing. Users could view up to three pages at once in separate tabs, and the interface had a smooth-action cursor which allowed users to jump between hyperlinks. The display could also be magnified.

Camera / Camcorder 
The Sharp SX862 featured a 3.15 megapixel camera with autofocus, automatic exposure control, and a high intensity LED light which enabled close-up photography in low-light conditions. It also offered VGA quality video recording and playback.

Specification sheet

Accessories 
Battery
Charger
Stereo Headset
CD-ROM
Data cable
Headset Kit
2GB MicroSD memory card
User Guide (Eng / Chi)

See also
 List of Sharp mobile phones

External links 
 Official SmarTone-Vodafone Sharp SX862 website
 Official Sharp SX862 Specifications
 Sharp SX862 on YouTube
 Sharp SX862 Video Converter Demo
 Mobile Gazette review of Sharp SX862 (Accessed 2008-08-22)
 Mobile Burn review of Sharp SX862 (Accessed 2008-08-22)
 Sharp SX862 - Full phone specifications

Sharp Corporation mobile phones